Biology data visualization is a branch of bioinformatics concerned with the application of computer graphics, scientific visualization, and information visualization to different areas of the life sciences. This includes visualization of sequences, genomes, alignments, phylogenies, macromolecular structures, systems biology, microscopy, and magnetic resonance imaging data. Software tools used for visualizing biological data range from simple, standalone programs to complex, integrated systems.

State-of-the-art and perspectives
Today we are experiencing a rapid growth in volume and diversity of biological data, presenting an increasing challenge for biologists. A key step in understanding and learning from these data is visualization. Thus, there has been a corresponding increase in the number and diversity of systems for visualizing biological data.

An emerging trend is the blurring of boundaries between the visualization of 3D structures at atomic resolution, visualization of larger complexes by cryo-electron microscopy, and visualization of the location of proteins and complexes within whole cells and tissues.

A second emerging trend is an increase in the availability and importance of time-resolved data from systems biology, electron microscopy and cell and tissue imaging. In contrast, visualization of trajectories has long been a prominent part of molecular dynamics.

Finally, as datasets are increasing in size, complexity, and interconnectedness, biological visualization systems are improving in usability, data integration and standardization.

List of visualization software

Many software systems are available for visualization biological data. The list below links some popularly used software, and systems grouped by application areas.

 Medusa - A simple tool for interaction graph analysis. It is a Java based application and available as an applet.
 Cytoscape - An open source software for integrating bio-molecular interaction networks with high-throughput expression data and other molecular states.
 Proviz - ProViz is a standalone open source application under the GPL license.
 PATIKA - It is a tool with integrated visual environment for collaborative construction and analysis of cellular pathways.

References

External links

Related conferences
 BioVis: Symposium on Biological Data Visualization
 Applications of Information Visualization in Bioinformatics
 CIBDV: Computational Intelligence for Biological Data Visualization
 IVBI: Information Visualization in Biomedical Informatics Symposium
 VMLS: Visualization in Medicine & Life Sciences
 VIZBI: Workshop on Visualizing Biological Data

Bioinformatics
Visualization (graphics)